Christopher Patrick "Pat" Johnston (16 July 1924 – 25 May 1971) was an Irish professional footballer who played as a wing half.

References

1924 births
1971 deaths
Association footballers from Dublin (city)
Republic of Ireland association footballers
Republic of Ireland expatriate association footballers
Association football wing halves
Shelbourne F.C. players
Middlesbrough F.C. players
Grimsby Town F.C. players
Skegness Town A.F.C. players
English Football League players
Expatriate footballers in England
League of Ireland XI players